The individual modern pentathlon at the 1972 Summer Olympics was one of two modern pentathlon events (both for men), along with the team competition. As usual in Olympic modern pentathlon, one competition was held and each competitor's score was included to the Individual competition event results table and was also added to his teammates' scores to be included to the Team competition event results table. This competition consisted of 5 disciplines:

Equestrian, held on August 27
Fencing, held on August 28 
Shooting, held on August 29 
Swimming, held on August 30 
Cross-country, held on August 31

Results

References

External links
Official Olympic Report

Men's individual